Walk the Plank is the second studio album from the American country music band Pirates of the Mississippi. Released in 1991 on Capitol Records Nashville, it includes the singles "Fighting for You", "Till I'm Holding You Again" and "Too Much", which was co-written by Lee Roy Parnell and Guy Clark. These singles respectively reached #41, #22, and #37 on the Hot Country Songs charts.

Track listing

Personnel
Rich Alves – guitars, backing vocals
Jimmy Lowe – drums, percussion
Bill McCorvey – guitars, lead vocals
Pat Severs – steel guitar, Dobro
Dean Townson – bass guitar, background vocals

Strings on "Fighting for You" performed by John Kelton.

Chart performance

Weekly charts

Year-end charts

References

1991 albums
Albums produced by Jimmy Bowen
Capitol Records albums
Pirates of the Mississippi albums